Low German is a Germanic language spoken mainly in Northern Germany and in Northeastern Netherlands.

 East Low German, a group of dialects spoken in north-eastern Germany and northern Poland
 Mennonite Low German, a language or group of dialects spoken by Mennonites
 Middle Low German, a language spoken from about 1100 to 1600
 Old Low German, a language documented from the 8th until the 12th century
 West Low German, a group of dialects spoken in northwest Germany, The Netherlands, and Denmark
 Low Germanic, term used by the German linguist Theo Vennemann in his controversial classification of the Germanic languages

Other uses
Low German house, a type of German timber-framed farmhouse
Sometimes used to refer to parts of Northern Germany, as distinct from the highlands in the south of Germany